The Toku Daihatsu Class or 17m landing craft was a type of landing craft, used by the Imperial Japanese Navy during World War II. It was designated the "Super Type A" landing craft by the United States.

History
It was a larger design of the Daihatsu Class landing craft, with a bow ramp that was lowered to disembark cargo upon riding up onto the beach. It was constructed of a metal hull and powered by a diesel engine.

Designed to carry a medium-sized tank or two eight ton tanks. The landing craft was used extensively to run troops and supplies to isolated garrisons, referred to as ant runs by the Japanese. The Allied air forces and U.S. PT boats undertook increasingly successful raids at intercepting and destroying these craft towards the end of World War II.

References

Jentschura, Hansgeorg; Jung, Dieter; and Mickel, Peter. Translated by Brown, J.D. 1977. Warships of the Imperial Japanese Navy, 1869-1945. Naval Institute Press. .
Military Monograph Series - Japanese Landing Craft of World War II. Merriam Press. 

Landing craft
Amphibious warfare vessels of Japan